The 1956–57 FA Cup  was the 76th staging of the world's oldest football cup competition, the Football Association Challenge Cup, commonly known as the FA Cup.  Aston Villa won the competition, beating Manchester United 2–1 in the final at Wembley, London.

Matches were played at the stadium of the team named first on the date specified for each round, which was always a Saturday. If scores were level after 90 minutes had been played, a replay would take place at the stadium of the second-named team later the same week. If the replayed match was drawn further replays would be held at neutral venues until a winner was determined. If scores were level after 90 minutes had been played in a replay, a 30-minute period of extra time would be played.

Calendar

Results

First round proper

At this stage all clubs from the Football League Third Division North and South joined those 30 non-league clubs having come through the qualifying rounds. To complete this round Bishop Auckland and Bedford Town given byes to this round. Matches were played on Saturday, 17 November 1956. Eight matches were drawn, with replays taking place later the same week.

Second round 

The matches were played on Saturday, 8 December 1956. Three matches were drawn, with replays taking place on the following Wednesday.

Third round 

The 44 First and Second Division clubs entered the competition at this stage and the matches were played on Saturday, 5 January 1957. Eleven matches were drawn, with replays taking place later the same week, and two ties required second replays, which were both played on Monday, 14 January 1957.

Fourth round 

The matches were played on Saturday, 26 January 1957. No replays were necessary.

Fifth round 

The matches were played on Saturday, 16 February 1957. Two matches were drawn and replayed later the same week.

Sixth Round

Replay

Replay

Replay

Semifinals

Replay

Final

The final took place on Saturday, 4 May 1957 at Wembley and ended in a victory for Aston Villa over Manchester United by 2–1. The attendance was 100,000.

Notes
A. : Match played at Goodison Park, Liverpool.
B. : Match played at Maine Road, Manchester.
C. : Dean Court's record attendance of 28,799 was set at this match.

References
General
The FA Cup Archive at TheFA.com
English FA Cup 1956/57  at Soccerbase
FA Cup 1956/57 results at Footballsite
Specific

 
FA Cup seasons